Dominic Marsh is an English theatre, television, and film actor.

Career
Marsh has performed at venues throughout the UK including the Oxford Playhouse and Regent's Park Open Air Theatre. In 2011 he appeared in Kneehigh Theatre's adaptation of The Umbrellas of Cherbourg as Roland Cassard.

Marsh played Harry Witherspoon in the 2013 feature film Lucky Stiff which screened at the 2014 Raindance Film Festival. In 2016, he appeared in the National Theatre of Scotland's production I Am Thomas as Sir James Stewart. The same year Marsh was nominated for Best Actor in a visiting production at the Manchester Theatre Awards for his role as Macheath in Kneehigh Theatre's Dead Dog in a Suitcase (& Other Love Songs).

In 2017 Marsh played Tristan in Kneehigh Theatre's acclaimed production of Tristan & Yseult at Shakespeare's Globe which also played St. Ann's Warehouse in New York and other venues in the USA and UK on two separate tours. He also starred as Jean-René in the new musical Romantics Anonymous based on the film of the same name at the Sam Wanamaker Playhouse, Emma Rice's outgoing production as artistic director of Shakespeare's Globe.

Marsh made his debut as a writer in 2013, working in collaboration with Dougal Irvine to create the musical The Other School for the National Youth Music Theatre. It was performed at the St James Theatre, London in August 2013. It is published by the Rodgers & Hammerstein Organization, part of Imagem Publishing.

Dominic's television appearances have included Doctors (playing semi-regular patient Smithy), DCI Banks, Coronation Street, and The Royals.

References

External links

Doctors webpage at BBC website
Photograph of Dominic Marsh as Smithey

Living people
Year of birth missing (living people)
English male television actors